Joseph Burke (born 18 May 1990) is a Welsh professional rugby league footballer who plays as a  for the West Wales Raiders in Betfred League 1 and Wales at international level.

Club career
He previously played for Oldham, South Wales Scorpions, Barrow and North Wales Crusaders, and played one game for Crusaders RL in the Super League while on loan at the club in 2011. He has also played for Wales at representative level.

International
In October and November 2014, Joe played in the 2014 European Cup competition.

In October and November 2015, Joe played in the 2015 European Cup competition.

In October 2016, Joe played in the 2017 World Cup qualifiers.

References

External links
(archived by web.archive.org) Oldham R.L.F.C. profile
(archived by web.archive.org) Statistics at rlwc2017.com
Wales profile
Welsh profile

1990 births
Living people
Barrow Raiders players
Crusaders Rugby League players
North Wales Crusaders players
Oldham R.L.F.C. players
Rugby league props
South Wales Scorpions players
Rugby league players from Newport, Wales
Wales national rugby league team players
Welsh rugby league players